Irina Khromacheva was the defending champion but chose not to participate.

Wang Xinyu won the title, defeating Erika Andreeva in the final, 3–6, 7–6(7–0), 6–0.

Seeds

Draw

Finals

Top half

Bottom half

References

Main Draw

Torneig Internacional de Tennis Femení Solgironès - Singles